Finished may refer to:

 Finished (novel), a 1917 novel by H. Rider Haggard
 Finished (film), a 1923 British silent romance film
 "Finished" (short story), a science fiction short story by L. Sprague de Camp

See also
Finishing (disambiguation)
Finish (disambiguation)